The Asmat – Kamrau Bay languages are a family of a dozen Trans–New Guinea languages spoken by the Asmat and related peoples in southern Western New Guinea. They are believed to be a recent expansion along the south coast, as they are all closely related, and there is little differentiation in their pronouns.

Languages
The languages are:
Kamrau Bay (Sabakor):
Buruwai (Sabakor)
Kamrau
North Kamberau (Iria)
South Kamberau (Asienara)
Asmat–Kamoro
Kamoro
Sempan
Asmat languages

Proto-language

Phonemes
Usher (2020) reconstructs the consonant inventory as follows:

{| 
| m || n ||  ||  
|-
| p || [t] ||  || k 
|-
| b || [d] || ɟ || ɡ
|-
| [ɸ] || s ||  ||  
|-
| w || r || j ||  
|}

There is near complementary distribution between *p and *ɸ. *t and *d are marginal, appearing in only a few words. *r does not occur initially. There are no consonant clusters. 

Vowels are *a *e *i *o *u.

Pronouns
Ross (2005) reconstructs the proto-Asmat–Kamoro pronouns as:

{|
! !!sg!!pl
|-
!1
|*no[ro]||*na[re]
|-
!2
|*o[ro]/we[rV]||*ca[re]
|-
!3
|*a[re]||
|}

Usher (2020) reconstructs the free proto–Asmat–Kamrau Bay pronouns as:
{|
|

|   
|

|   
|

|}

Basic vocabulary
Some lexical reconstructions by Usher (2020) are:

{| class="wikitable sortable"
! gloss !! Proto-Asmat-Kamrau !! Proto-Kamrau Bay !! Proto-Asmat-Kamoro !! Proto-Asmat !! Proto-Muli Strait
|-
! head
| *uɸu || *jebin || *ufu || *kowisi 'head/skull' || *ɣo̝p 'head/hair'; *uɔndVro̝m 'head/skull'
|-
! hair
| *ɸini || *ɸin || *fini || *ɸinV 'hair/feather(s)' || *sin
|-
! ear
| *jiɸ[a/o]ne || *jaɸ[a/o]m || *jafane || *jaɸane || *ie̝pær
|-
! eye
| *manaN || *manam || *mana || *mana || *musiɣ
|-
! nose
| *miC || *mik || *mi || *mi || *mæne̝ɣ 'nose/tip'
|-
! tooth
| *siC || *sik || *sisi || *sisV || *ziɣ
|-
! tongue
| *komane || *[a]mam || *komane || *komVne || *ndupæn
|-
! foot/leg
| *mawu || *mawu || *mawu || *mawi || *kaŋg 'leg'
|-
! blood/red
| *ese || *et || *ese ||  || *ir 'blood'
|-
! fruit/seed/bone
| *eake || *eke || *eake ||  || 
|-
! skin/bark
|  || *ɸu || *pitini || *pitʲini || *par
|-
! breast
| *awo || *awo || *awo ||  || *abuɣ
|-
! louse
| *amo || *om || *amo ||  || *am
|-
! dog
| *juwuɾi || *iwuɾ || *juwuri || *juwVɾi || *i[u]bui
|-
! pig
| *oɸo || *ok || *ofo ||  || *up
|-
! bird
|  || *geɟ ||  || *sakV || 
|-
! egg
| *[a]sa || *asa || *sa || *sa || 
|-
! tree/wood
| *ose || *o || *ose ||  || *to̝ 'tree'
|-
! man/male
|  || *bewu ||  ||  || *nam 'man/person'
|-
! woman
| *ɟawoɟa || *jawoɟa || *cawoca || *jipitʲi || *ie̝t 'woman/wife'
|-
! sun
| *jawu || *asi 'sun/day' || *jawu || *jawi || *zaua
|-
! moon
| *buɾa || *buɾa || *pura || *piɾa || *irind
|-
! water
| *m[oi/ui] || *moɟ || *mui || *mui || *mo̝i
|-
! fire/firewood
| *usa || *usa || *usa || *jusa || *ua[nd/r] 'fire'
|-
! stone
| *jeta || *eta || *j[e]ka ||  || *mæte̝
|-
! path
|  || *matoC; *mak || *mato ||  || 
|-
! name
| *uwase || *u || *uwase || *juwase || *ur
|-
! eat/drink
| *n[a]- || *n[a]- || *n[e/a] || *ne- || *no̝ku
|-
! one
| *ɟawa[kV] || *-ɟawa || *cawak[e/a] || *tʲawaka || 
|-
! two
| *kaboma || *aboma || *kapoma; *jam[i/u]nV ||  || 
|}

Evolution

Proto-Asmat-Kamoro reflexes (Voorhoeve 2005) of proto-Trans-New Guinea (pTNG) etyma, as listed in Pawley & Hammarström (2018):

 *fiti ‘fingernail’ < pTNG *mb(i,u)t(i,u)C
 *isi ‘mosquito’ < *kasin
 *ese ‘blood’ < *kenja
 *masap or *masip ‘saliva’ < *si(mb,p)atV
 *yi ‘urine’ < *[si]si
 *asa ‘excrement’ < *asa
 *manaka ‘eye’ < *mun(a,e,i)ka
 *sisi ‘tooth’ < *(t,s)i(t,s)i
 *yirama ‘night’ < *k(i,u)tama
 *tama ‘morning’ < *k(i,u)tama
 *na- ‘eat’ < *na-

References

Bibliography
 Drabbe, Piet. 1953. Spraakkunst van de Kamoro-taal. The Hague: Martinus Nijhoff.
 Drabbe, Piet. 1963. Drie Asmat-dialecten. Verhandelingen van het Koninklijk Instituut voor Taal-, Land- en Volkenkunde, No. 42. The Hague: Martinus Nijhoff.
 
 Voorhoeve, C.L. 1965. The Flamingo Bay Dialect of the Asmat language. Verhandelingen van het Koninklijk Instituut voor Taal-, Land- en Volkenkunde, No. 46. The Hague. 
 Voorhoeve, C.L. 1968. "The Central and South New Guinea Phylum: a report on the language situation in south New Guinea." Pacific Linguistics, Series A, No. 16: 1-17. Canberra: The Australian National University.
 Voorhoeve, C.L. 1975. Languages of Irian Jaya: Checklist, Preliminary Classification, Language Maps, Wordlists. Pacific Linguistics, Series B, No. 31. Canberra: The Australian National University.
 Voorhoeve, C.L. 1980. The Asmat Languages of Irian Jaya. Pacific Linguistics, Series B, No. 64. Canberra: The Australian National University.
 Wurm, Stephan Adolphe. 1983. The Papuan Languages of Oceania. Ars Linguistica 7. Tübingen: Narr.

External links 
 Timothy Usher & Edgar Suter, New Guinea World, Proto–Asmat – Kamrau Bay

 
Asmat–Mombum languages